Martin Keith Bolland (born August 1956) is a British businessman, the chairman of Capita, and a co-founder and partner of Alchemy Partners.

Early life
Martin Keith Bolland was born in August 1956. He has a bachelor's degree in Economics from Cambridge University. He is a chartered accountant.

Career
He is the chairman of Capita since January 2010, and chairman of QHotels. He is a co-founder and partner of Alchemy Partners.

Personal life
Bolland lives in England.

References

1956 births
British businesspeople
Living people
Private equity and venture capital investors